Lee Ji-hyun, Lee Ji-hyeon or Ri Ji-hyon (이지현) is a Korean name; the surname is Lee and the (unisex) given name is Ji-hyun. It is the name of:
 Ji-Hyun Lee (statistician), American biostatistician
 Lee Ji-hyun (actress) (born 1983), South Korean actress and singer
 Lee Ji-hyun (swimmer, born 1978), South Korean swimmer
 Lee Jie-hyun (born 1979), South Korean swimmer
 Lee Ji-hyun (swimmer, born 1982), South Korean swimmer
 Qri (born 1986), or Lee Ji-hyun, South Korean singer and actress